Credo: John Paul II is the fourth DVD released by Italian tenor, Andrea Bocelli, celebrating the life of pope John Paul II.

Throughout the DVD, Bocelli sings, in the background, songs from his 1999 album Sacred Arias.

Overview
The DVD contains footage of highlights of John Paul II's pontificate, his spiritual heritage, his most significant meetings with heads of states, but also his contact with people from all over the world, from the day of his election to his funeral.

Track listing
 Ave Verum Corpus, K. 618 - Mozart
 Ave Maria - Caccini/Mercurio
 Sancta Maria - Mascagni, Arr. Mercurio
 Ave Maria (Arr. Bach's Prelude No.1Bwv 846) - Bach/Gounod
 Panis Angelicus - Franck, Orch. Michelot
 Domine Deus (from Petite messe solennelle, Gloria) - Rossini
 Pietà, Signore - Niedermeyer, Arr. Reynolds
 Gloria a Te Cristo Gesù (the Hymn of the Great Jubilee) Proteggimi - Orch. Serio/Sartori - F.Sartori/L.Quartotto
 Frondi tenere...Ombra mai fu (Serse/Act 1) - Händel
 Mille cherubini in coro - Schubert, Arr. Mercurio
 Ingemisco (Messa da Requiem) - Verdi
 Ave Maria "Ellens Gesang III,D839" - Schubert, Orch. Weingartner
 Agnus Dei - Bizet, Arr. Guiraud
 Cujus Animam Gementem (Stabat Mater) - Rossini
 I Believe - Levi
 Adeste Fideles (O come, all ye faithful)'' - Trad. Arr. Mercurio

References

External links
Credo-Giovanni Paolo II: Celebrating the upcoming beatification of Pope John Paul II Sugar Music

Italian musical films
Andrea Bocelli video albums
2006 video albums
Pope John Paul II